Modern Media Center is a skyscraper  in Changzhou, China. It was completed in August 2013.

References

Skyscrapers in Jiangsu
Commercial buildings completed in 2013
Buildings and structures in Changzhou
2013 establishments in China
Skyscraper office buildings in China